The Lackey and the Lady is a 1919 British silent drama film directed by Thomas Bentley and starring Leslie Howard, A. E. Matthews and Roy Travers. It was based on a novel by Tom Gallon.

The film was the subject of a court case after its distributor Phillips Film Company refused to circulate it on the grounds of its alleged poor quality. The director Bentley sued for slander and won a judgement in his favour in the early 1920s. However, the negative publicity surrounding the film severely damaged the reputation of the British Actors Film Company which had been relaunched after the First World War with ambitious production plans but was eventually forced to merge with one of its larger rivals.

Cast
 Leslie Howard as Tony Dunciman
 A. E. Matthews
 Roy Travers
 Alban Atwood as Mr. Dunciman
 F. Pope-Stamper as Garrett Woodruffe
 Mary Odette
 Violet Graham
 Adelaide Grace
 Jeff Barlow
 Gladys Foyle
 Athol Ford

References

Bibliography
 Low, Rachael. History of the British Film, 1918-1929. George Allen & Unwin, 1971.

External links

1919 films
1919 drama films
British drama films
1910s English-language films
Films directed by Thomas Bentley
British silent feature films
Films based on British novels
British black-and-white films
1910s British films
Silent drama films